Balasinești is a village in Briceni District, Moldova.

Notable people
 Nicolae Cernăuțeanu

References

Villages of Briceni District
Khotinsky Uyezd
Hotin County
Ținutul Suceava